Clermont Township may refer to the following townships in the United States:

 Clermont Township, Fayette County, Iowa
 Clermont Township, Adams County, North Dakota

See also 
 Clermont, Abitibi-Témiscamingue, Quebec, a township municipality in Quebec, Canada